Gabrijele is a village west of Krmelj in the Municipality of Sevnica in central Slovenia. The area is part of the historical region of Styria. The municipality is now included in the Lower Sava Statistical Region. 

The local church is dedicated to Saint Leonard and belongs to the Parish of Tržišče. It dates to the early 16th century.

References

External links
Gabrijele at Geopedia

Populated places in the Municipality of Sevnica